Marcel Artelesa (2 July 1938 – 23 September 2016) was a French footballer who played as a defender. He played for France at the 1960 Summer Olympics, and in the 1966 FIFA World Cup in England.

Honours
AS Monaco
French championship: 1963
Coupe de France: 1963

References

Profile on French federation official site

Profile

1938 births
2016 deaths
French footballers
France international footballers
Association football defenders
AS Troyes-Savinienne players
AS Monaco FC players
Olympique de Marseille players
OGC Nice players
Ligue 1 players
Ligue 2 players
Olympic footballers of France
Footballers at the 1960 Summer Olympics
1966 FIFA World Cup players